West Papua, formerly Irian Jaya Barat (West Irian), is a province of Indonesia. It covers the two western peninsulas of the island of New Guinea, the eastern half of the Bird's Head Peninsula (or Doberai Peninsula) and the Bomberai Peninsula, along with nearby smaller islands. The province is bordered to the north by the Pacific Ocean, to the west by the Halmahera Sea and the Ceram Sea, to the south by the Banda Sea, and to the east by the province of Central Papua and the Cenderawasih Bay. Manokwari is the province's capital and largest city. West Papua is the second-least populous province in Indonesia (after South Papua). It had a population of 1,134,068 at the 2020 Census, and the official estimate for mid 2022 was 1,183,307. However the total area and population will be reduced by the Parliamentary decision on 17 November 2022 to create a 38th province of Indonesia, comprising Sorong city and the regencies of Sorong, South Sorong, Raja Ampat, Maybrat and Tambrauw. The reduced West Papua Province will thus have a mid-2022 population estimated at only 561,403.

After the Japanese surrender, the Dutch remained in New Guinea until 1962 when they transferred the control of the region to the Indonesian government as a part of the New York Agreement. West Papua was legally created as a province in 1999, but it was not inaugurated until 2003. Consisting until 2022 of twelve regencies and one city, the province has a special autonomous status as granted by Indonesian legislation.

West Papua has a medium Human Development Index, which is the second lowest among Indonesia's 38 provinces. The Indonesian government has launched the building of ambitious infrastructure projects including the Trans-Papua Highway, airports, and other facilities. Detractors claim that these projects threaten Southeast Asia's and Oceania's last large regions of tropical rainforests and native cultures. According to Bank Indonesia, West Papua recorded an economic growth rate of 7.7% during 2018, which is higher than the national economic growth.

History

Etymology
There are several theories regarding the origin of the word Papua. One theory is that the name comes from the word 'Papo-Ua', named by the Tidore Sultanate, which in the Tidore language means "not joining" or "not being united", meaning that the island had no king. Before the age of colonization, the Tidore Sultanate controlled some parts of the Bird's Head Peninsula in what is now the province of Southwest Papua before expanding to also include coastal regions in the current province of Papua. This relationship played an important historical role in binding Indonesia to the Papua. Another theory is that the word Papua comes from the Malay word 'papuwah', which means 'frizzled hair'. It was first mentioned in 1812 Malay Dictionary by William Marsden, although it was not found on earlier dictionaries. In the records of 16th century Portuguese and Spanish sailors, the word 'Papua' is the designation for the inhabitants who inhabit the Raja Ampat Islands and the coastal parts of the Bird's Head Peninsula.

The former name of the province, Irian Jaya, was suggested during a tribal committee meeting in Tobati, Jayapura, formed by Atmoprasojo, head of bestuur school in the 1940s, Frans Kaisiepo the committee leader suggested name from Mansren Koreri myths, Iri-an from the Biak language of Biak Island, meaning "hot land" referring to local hot climate, but also from Iryan which means heated process as a methapor for a land that is entering new era. In Serui Iri-an means "pillar of nation", while in Merauke Iri-an means "rising spirit" or "to rise". The name was promoted in 1945 by Marcus Kaisiepo, brother of the future governor Frans Kaisiepo. The name Irian was politicized later by Marthin Indey and Silas Papare with the Indonesian acronym 'Ikut Republik Indonesia Anti Nederland' (Join the Republic of Indonesia oppose the Netherlands). The name was used throughout the Suharto administration, until it was changed to Papua during the administration of President Abdurrahman Wahid.

The Dutch, who arrived later under Jacob Le Maire and Willem Schouten, called it Schouten island. They later used this name only to refer to islands off the north coast of Papua proper, the Schouten Islands or Biak Island. When the Dutch colonized this island as part of the Dutch East Indies, they called it Nieuw Guinea.

Speakers align themselves with a political orientation when choosing a name for the western half of the island of New Guinea. The official name of the region is "Papua" according to International Organization for Standardization (ISO). Independence activists refer to the region as "West Papua," while Indonesian officials have also used "West Papua" to name the westernmost province of the region since 2007. Historically, the region has had the official names of Netherlands New Guinea (1895–1962), West Irian or Irian Barat (1962–73), Irian Jaya (1973–2002), Irian Jaya Barat (2003–2007), and Papua Barat (2007–present).

Pre-colonial era 

Papuan habitation of the region is estimated to have begun between 42,000 and 48,000 years ago. Research indicates that the highlands were an early and independent center of agriculture, and show that agriculture developed gradually over several thousands of years; the banana has been cultivated in this region for at least 7,000 years. Austronesian peoples migrating through Maritime Southeast Asia settled in the area at least 3,000 years ago, and populated especially in Cenderawasih Bay. Diverse cultures and languages have developed in the island due to geographical isolation; there are over 300 languages and two hundred additional dialects in the region (see Papuan languages, Austronesian languages, Central–Eastern Malayo-Polynesian languages).

Ghau Yu Kuan, a Chinese merchant, came to Papua around the latter half of 500 AD and referred to it as Tungki, the area where they obtained spices. Meanwhile, in the latter half of 600 AD, the Sumatra-based empire of Srivijaya (7th century–13th century) referred to the island as Janggi. The empire engaged in trade relations with western New Guinea, initially taking items like sandalwood and birds-of-paradise in tribute to China, but later making slaves out of the natives. It was only at the beginning of 700 AD that traders from Persia and Gujarat began to arrive in what is now Papua and call it Dwi Panta or Samudrananta, which means 'at edge of the ocean'.  

The 14th-century Majapahit poem Nagarakretagama mentioned Wwanin or Onin and Sran as a recognized territory in the east, today identified as Onin peninsula in Fakfak Regency in the western part of the larger Bomberai Peninsula south of the Bird's Head region of Western New Guinea. At that time, Papua was said to be the eighth region of the Majapahit Empire. Wanin or Onin was probably the oldest name in recorded history to refer to the western part of the island of New Guinea. A transcript from the Nagarakretagama says the following:

 Ikang sakasanusasanusa Makasar Butun Banggawai Kuni Ggaliyao mwang i [ng] Salaya Sumba Solot Muar muwah tigang i Wandan Ambwan Athawa maloko Ewanin ri Sran ini Timur ning angeka nusatutur.

According to some linguists, the word Ewanin is another name for Onin, while Sran popularly misunderstood to refers to Seram Island in Maluku, is more likely another name for Kowiai. The local Papuan kingdom in its native language is called Sran Eman Muun which is based in Kaimana and its furthest influence extends to the Kei Islands, in southeastern Maluku. In his book Nieuw Guinea, Dutch author WC. Klein explained the beginning of the influence of the Bacan Sultanate in Papua. There he wrote: In 1569 Papoese hoof den bezoeken Batjan. Ee aanterijken worden vermeld (In 1569, Papuan tribal leaders visited Bacan, which resulted in the creation of new kingdoms). According to the oral history of the Biak people, there used to be a relationship and marriage between their tribal chiefs and the sultans of Tidore. The Biak people is the largest Melanesian tribe that spreads on the northern coast of Papua, therefore the Biak language is also the most widely used and considered the language of Papuan unity. Due to the relationship of the coastal areas of Papua with the Sultans of Maluku, there are several local kingdoms on this island, which shows the entry of the system of feudalism that does not originated from Papua itself.

Since the 16th century, apart from the Raja Ampat Islands which was contested between the Bacan Sultanate, Tidore Sultanate, and Ternate Sultanate, other coastal areas of Papua from the island of Biak to Mimika have become a vassal of the Tidore Sultanate. The Tidore Sultanate adheres to the trade pact and custom of Uli-Siwa ( federation of nine ), so there were nine trade partners led by Tidore in opposition to Ternate-led Uli Lima ( federation of five ). In administering its regions in Papua, Tidore divide them to three regions, Korano Ngaruha or Raja Ampat Islands, Papoua Gam Sio and Mafor Soa Raha. The role of these kingdoms began to decline due to the entry of traders from Europe to the archipelago which marks the beginning of colonialism in the Indonesian Archipelago. During Tidore's rule, the main exports of the island during this period were resins, spices, slaves and the highly priced feathers of the bird-of-paradise. Sultan Nuku, one of the most famous Tidore sultans who rebelled against Dutch colonization, called himself "Sultan of Tidore and Papua", during his revolt in 1780s. He commanded loyalty from both Moluccan and Papuan chiefs, especially those of Raja Ampat Islands. Following Tidore's defeat, much of the territory it claimed in western part of New Guinea came under Dutch rule as part of Dutch East Indies.

Colonial era
In 1511, Antonio d'Arbau, a Portuguese sailor, called the Papua region as "Os Papuas" or llha de Papo. Don Jorge de Menetes, a sailor from Spain also stopped by in Papua a few years later (1526–1527), he refers to the region as 'Papua', which was mentioned in the diary of Antonio Figafetta, the clerk for the Magellan voyage. The name Papua was known to Figafetta when he stopped on the island of Tidore.

On 16 May 1545, Yñigo Ortiz de Retez, a Spanish maritime explorer who in command of the San Juan de Letran, left port in Tidore, an island which was Spain's stronghold in the Maluku Islands and going by way of the Talaud Islands and the Schoutens, reached the northern coast of New Guinea, which was coasted till the end of August when, having got to the 5°S latitude, contrary winds and currents forced a return to Tidore where he arrived on 5 October 1545. Many islands were encountered and first charted, along the northern coast of New Guinea, and in the Padaidos, Le Maires, Ninigos, Kaniets and Hermits, to some of which Spanish names were given. On 20 June 1545 at the mouth of the Mamberamo River (that was charted as San Agustin) he took possession of the land for the Spanish Crown, in the process giving the island the name by which it is known today. He called it Nueva Guinea owing to the resemblance of the local inhabitants to the peoples of the Guinea coast in West Africa. The first map showing the whole island (as an island) was published in 1600 and shown 1606, Luís Vaz de Torres explored the southern coast of New Guinea from Milne Bay to the Gulf of Papua including Orangerie Bay, which he named Bahía de San Lorenzo. His expedition also discovered Basilaki Island, naming it Tierra de San Buenaventura, which he claimed for Spain in July 1606. On 18 October, his expedition reached the western part of the island in present-day Indonesia, and also claimed the territory for the King of Spain.

In 1606, a Duyfken expedition led by the commander Wiliam Jansen from Holland landed in Papua. This expedition consisted of 3 ships, where they sailed from the north coast of Java and stopped at the Kei Islands, at the southwestern coast of Papua. With the increasing Dutch grip in the region, the Spanish left New Guinea in 1663. In 1660, the Dutch recognized the Sultan of Tidore's sovereignty over New Guinea. New Guinea thus became notionally Dutch as the Dutch held power over Tidore.

Dutch New Guinea in the early 19th century was administered from the Moluccas. Although the coast had been mapped in 1825 by Lieutenant Commander D.H. Kolff, there had been no serious effort to establish a permanent presence in Dutch New Guinea. The British, however, had shown considerable interest in the area, and were threatening to settle it. To prevent this, the Governor of the Moluccas, Pieter Merkus, urged the Dutch government to establish posts along the coast. An administrative and trading post established in 1828 on Triton Bay on the southwest coast of New Guinea. The post was named Fort Du Bus for the then-Governor General of the Dutch East Indies, Leonard du Bus de Gisignies. On 24 August 1828, the birthday of King William I of the Netherlands, the Dutch flag was hoisted and Dutch claimed all of western Papua, which they called Nieuw Guinea. In the ceremony, multiple tribes and kingdoms of the region was invited. The Dutch reorganized VOC vassalization system of Tidore Sultanate with the Sultan being given new rattan baton with gold head (formerly having VOC stamp). Under him, Sendawan (King of Namatota), Kassa (King of Lahakia) and Lutu ("Orang Kaya" from Lobo and Mawara) were recognized as leader of the regions which was symbolized by three rattan batons with silver head. Under those three, The Netherlands also recognized another twenty eight tribes or vassal kingdoms. Almost 30 years later, Germans established the first missionary settlement on an island near Manokwari. While in 1828 the Dutch claimed the south coast west of the 141st meridian and the north coast west of Humboldt Bay in 1848, they did not try to develop the region again until 1896; they established settlements in Manokwari and Fak-Fak in response to perceived Australian ownership claims from the eastern half of New Guinea.

Under Tidore hegemony around Onin Peninsula, there was three main local kingdoms Atiati, Fatagar, and Rumbati led by Bauw dynasty. In 1878, there was a war between Rumbati on one side and Fatagar and Atiati on the other side. Atiati and Fatagar moved their capitals to Ega islands. After some time there was a conflict between Atiati and Fatagar, as a result Atiati moved its capital to the mainland on the coast just across Ega island which come to be known as Atiati in modern time. Meanwhile, Fatagar moved its capital to a place called Merapi, located on the eastern side of Fakfak town in modern time.

Great Britain and Germany had recognized the Dutch claims in treaties of 1885 and 1895. At much the same time, Britain claimed south-east New Guinea, later known as the Territory of Papua, and Germany claimed the northeast, later known as the Territory of New Guinea. The German, Dutch and British colonial administrators each attempted to suppress the still-widespread practices of inter-village warfare and headhunting within their respective territories. In 1901, the Netherlands formally purchased West New Guinea from the Sultanate of Tidore, incorporating it into the Netherlands East Indies.

Other local kingdoms around the area, were formerly under the dominion of Rumbati kingdom but achieved kingdom status when the Netherlands achieved hegemony of the area in 1898, these includes: Patipi kingdom centered in Patipi Bay in Fakfak, Sekar kingdom in Kokas led by Rumagesan dynasty, Wertuar kingdom centered in Sisir led by Heremba dynasty, Arguni kingdom centered in Arguni islands in Kaimana.
Other kingdoms in the area include Namatota Kingdom, and Sran Kingdom.

Modern era
During the Indonesian National Awakening period several Indonesian nationalists were interned in the Boven-Digoel detention camp in modern-day Papua province, mostly from the failed 1926 communist uprising. This began the long interaction and formation of local Indonesian nationalist movement in Western New Guinea. Following its independence declaration from the Netherlands in 1945, Indonesia claimed all of the territory of the former Dutch East Indies, including Western New Guinea. Local figures like Silas Papare created PKII In 1946 centered in Serui to begin preparation for revolution war against the Netherlands. To counter this Netherlands formed the Papuan Council.

In 1947 Malino Conference the formation of United States of Indonesia was considered but because of pressure from local Dutch politicians hoping to create a West New Guinea country for fleeing Indo-Eurasians, they decided against including West New Guinea in United States of Indonesia. This is contrary to the local Papuan delegates in the event, Frans Kaisiepo who argued for the inclusion of West Papua with Indonesia. This is also the first time 'Irian' is proposed to describe the territory as suggested by Kaisiepo. Kaisiepo was then rejected to becoming Dutch New Guinea representatives during 1949 Round-Table Conference which resulted in United States of Indonesia independence and postponement of the Western new Guinea status negotiation to the next year.

However, by 1950s Republic of Indonesia Government dissolved United States of Indonesia and many of the constituent merged to form United Republic of Indonesia. This angered the Dutch because it destroyed their influence in many of the formed republics constituent of BFO and the dissolving of Dutch-Indonesian Union. As a result, the region was still retained by the Dutch, which caused increasing tension of Netherlands with Indonesia.

By December 1957, Sukarno frustrated with the lack of progress for Western New Guinea negotiation, decided to nationalise around 246 Dutch companies dominating Indonesian economy. By early 1960s Indonesia also began to accept increasing amounts of Soviet-bloc military aid. This leads to increasingly aggressive stance by Indonesia. In April 1961, Netherlands announced the formation of a Nieuw Guinea Raad, intending to create an independent Papuan state. Indonesia declared intention of military confrontation by Formation of Tri Komando Rakjat (TRIKORA) speech in Yogyakarta, on 19 December 1961. Indonesia then began to direct military incursions into the half-island, which he referred to as West Irian. By the end of 1962, 3,000 Indonesian soldiers were present throughout West Irian/West Papua. Although most of these military incursion managed to make contact with local Indonesian nationalists most were unsuccessful in taking control and were captured by Dutch authority.

United States fearing more Indonesian shift toward the Soviet block, formulated a plan to resolve the Western New Guinea dispute. Indonesian delegation include several Indonesian nationalists from West Papua Who managed to flee and made contact during earlier incursions, such as: Marthen Indey and Silas Papare. It was agreed through the New York Agreement in 1962 that the administration of Western New Guinea would be temporarily transferred from the Netherlands to Indonesia and that by 1969 the United Nations should oversee a referendum of the Papuan people, in which they would be given two options: to remain part of Indonesia or to become an independent nation. This vote was referred to as the Act of Free Choice. However, the vote was reportedly conducted by consensus of government-selected delegates, numbering slightly over 1,000, which represent the elite of Papuan society, mostly Papuan tribal elders and local kings such as Machmud Singgirei Rumagesan kings of Sekar, and the few local Papuans luckily to receive education during the earlier period of Dutch East Indies. The referendum was recognised by the international community and the region became the Indonesian province of Irian Jaya (renamed Papua in 1999). The result of the compromised vote was rejected by West Papuan nationalists, who are mostly from the newer generation of Dutch New Guinea educated elites, who established the Free Papua Movement (OPM) which have roots in the earlier Dutch-formed Papuan Council. The independence movement for West Papua has continued, primarily through peaceful protest and international pressure, but also guerrilla warfare against the Indonesian administration.

The Papua conflict is an ongoing conflict in Western New Guinea between Indonesia and the Free Papua Movement (Indonesian: Organisasi Papua Merdeka, OPM). Subsequent to the withdrawal of the Dutch administration from the Netherlands New Guinea in 1962 and implementation of Indonesian administration in 1963, the Free Papua Movement has conducted a low-intensity guerrilla war against Indonesia through the targeting of its military, police, and civilian populations.

The province of West Papua was established out of the western portion of the province of Papua in February 2003, initially under the name of West Irian Jaya (Irian Jaya Barat). In November 2004, an Indonesian court agreed that the split violated Papua's autonomy laws. However, the court ruled that because the new province had already been established, it should remain separate from Papua. The ruling also prohibited the creation of another proposed province, Central Irian Jaya, as that division had not yet been formalised. The split is in line with the general trend of provincial splits that is occurring in all parts of Indonesia in the post-Suharto era.

The name of the province was changed to Papua Barat in 2007. The new name applies from that date, but a plenary session of the provincial legislative council is required to legalise the change of name, and the government needed to issue an implementing regulation. Since April 18, 2007 the government has issued the implementing regulation.

In November 2022, Sorong City and West Papua's westernmost regencies form the province of Southwest Papua despite their location on the northwestern part of the island.

Geography

This provincial area (prior to its splitting into two separate provinces in late 2022) included the Bird's Head Peninsula and Bomberai Peninsula, along with nearby islands of which the largest are the Raja Ampat Islands. In the north, the province was bordered by the Pacific Ocean, the west by North Maluku province and Maluku province, the eastern part by Cenderawasih Bay, the south by the Ceram Sea and the southeast by Central Papua Province. The boundary of West Papua was almost the same as the Afdeling boundary ("part") West Nieuw-Guinea ("West New Guinea") in the Dutch East Indies. The province is divided into several regencies and the provincial-level city of Sorong.

The climate in West Papua also tends to be the same as the climate in the Papua Province, which is tropical with rainfall varying in each region.

The land condition in West Papua is almost the same as the Papua Province where the land surface is in the form of cliffs and slopes. The types of soil in West Papua are latosol, resina, red and yellow medeteren, podsol, red yellow podsolic, gray red podsolic, litosol, alluvia, gray hydromorph.

The mountains in West Papua include the Arfak Mountains in Arfak Mountains Regency, the Fak-Fak Mountains in Fak-Fak Regency, Mount Fudi in Fak-Fak Regency, Kumafa Mountains in Fak-Fak Regency, Mount Kwoko in Sorong Regency, Tamarau Mountains, in Sorong Regency, Mount Togwomeri in Manokwari Regency, Mount Wasada in Manokwari Regency, Mount Wiwi in Manokwari Regency.

Lakes in West Papua include Lake Ayamaru in Maybrat Regency, Anggi Giji Lake in Manokwari Regency, Anggi Gita Lake in Manokwari Regency, Lake Yamur in Manokwari Regency, Lake Yawasi in Sorong Regency.

The province is rich in karst areas. Many of these areas remain unexplored from a speleological point of view. Among the most important caves explored, there are the Lomo Longmot e Lomo Iono Besar (−360 e −315 meter deep), second and fourth cave for depth of Indonesia. This cave was explored in the 1990s by a French speleology expedition team in the Lina Mountains region, Irameba Village, Anggi District, Manokwari Regency. Recently the karst system of the Aouk-Kladuk river has been explored. At present, it is the largest underground river explored on the planet.

Administrative divisions

Before 1999, the areas now forming (since 2003) West Papua province consisted of three regencies (kabupaten) – Manokwari, Sorong and Fakfak. The City of Sorong was separated from Sorong Regency on 4 October 1999 and established as a regency-level administration. Five new regencies were created on 11 December 2002 - Kaimara from part of Fakfak Regency, Raja Ampat (the Raja Ampat Islands off the west coast of Papua) and South Sorong (Sorong Selatan) from further parts of Sorong Regency, and Teluk Bintuni and Telek Wondama from parts of Manokwari Regency. In late 2008 two new regencies were created from other arts of Sorong Regency - Tambrauw on 29 October, and Maybrat on 19 December. Thus by 2009 the province was administratively divided into ten regencies (kabupaten) and the autonomous city (kota), which together were subdivided into 155 districts (kecamatan) at the 2010 Census. Two further new regencies were created on 25 October 2012 – South Manokwari (Manokwari Selatan) and Arfak Mountains (Pegunungan Arfak) – both from districts which were formerly parts of the Manokwari Regency, while four further districts of Manokwari Regency were added to Tambrauw Regency.

All the existing regencies and the city, as existing prior to the Government approval for the creation of Southwest Papua Province in November 2022, are listed below with their areas and their populations at the 2010 Census and the 2020 Census, together with the official estimates as at mid 2022. The number of districts has been increased to 218, comprising 1,986 villages in 2019.

On 25 October 2013 the People's Representative Council began reviewing draft laws on the establishment of 57 prospective regencies/cities (and 8 new provinces). This included a new province of Southwest Papua to be created out of the existing West Papua province, together with eight new regencies and one city to be formed within the existing West Papua Province – Malamoy and Maibratsau (both taken from Sorong Regency), Imeo (from South Sorong Regency), North Raja Ampat and South Raja Ampat (both from Raja Ampat Regency), Raja Maskona (from Teluk Bintuni Regency), Okas (from Fakfak Regency), and West Manokwari (from Manokwari Regency), while the new city is Manokwari (from Manokwari Regency). These projected changes have not yet (by 2023) been implemented.

Economy
This province has tremendous potential, both agriculture, mining, forest products and tourism. Pearls and seaweed are produced in Raja Ampat Regency while the only traditional weaving industry called Timor fabric is produced in South Sorong Regency. Fragrant nutmeg syrup can be obtained in Fak-Fak Regency as well as various other potentials. Besides that nature tourism is also one of the mainstays of West Papua, such as the Cenderawasih Bay National Park located in Teluk Wondama Regency. This National Park stretches from the east of the Kwatisore Peninsula to the north of Rumberpon Island with a coastline of 500 km, the land area reaches 68,200 ha, sea area 1,385,300 ha with details of 80,000 ha of coral reefs and 12,400 ha of ocean.

Demographics

Ethnic groups

51.48% of the total population in West Papua are the native Papuan people. They are several tribes in West Papua. The tribes that inhabit West Papua Province are Abun, Ambel, Arfak, Awe, Ayamaru, Ayfat, Aytino, Batanta, Biak, Biga, Bira, Borai, Butlih, Domu, Doreri, Emeyode, Fiawat, Hatam, Irarutu, Irires, Iwaro, Kais, Kawe, Koiwai, Kuri, Langanyan, Madekwana, Mairasi, Maniwak, Matbat, Mbaham, Matta, Meiah, Meybrat, Miere, Miyay, Moi, Moire, Moru, Moskona, Mpur, Napiti, Oburauw, Roon, Roswar, Sebyar, Sougb, Soviar, Sumuri, Tehit, Tepin, Wamesa, Warumba, Waruri, Wawiyai, Wondama, Yaben Nerigo, Yabin Konda.

When viewed from cultural characteristics, livelihoods and patterns of life, indigenous Papuans can be divided into two major groups, namely mountainous Papua or inland, highlands and lowland and coastal Papua. The belief pattern of traditional Papuan religions unites and absorbs all aspects of life, they have an integral worldview that is closely related to one another between material and spiritual worlds, which are secular and sacred and both function together.

The remaining population are mostly migrants from other parts of Indonesia, such as the Javanese, Buginese, Makassarese, Minahasan, Torajan, Butonese, and Moluccans.

Religion

The population of West Papua Province embraces different religions. Data in 2021 showed that the largest percentage of religious believers were Protestant Christians (54.17%), then Islam (36.74%), Catholic Christians (8.71%), Hinduism (0.19%), and Buddhism (0.19%). Islam had been present in the coastal region of Papua because of its past relationship with Tidore and Ternate sultanates. Based on family account of Abdullah Arfan, the dynasty of Salawati Kingdom, mentioned in the 16th century the first Papuan Muslim was Kalewan who married Siti Hawa Farouk, a muballighah from Cirebon, and changed his name to Bayajid who became the ancestor of Arfan clan. In the province, the city of Manokwari has come to be known as the "Gospel City", as it is directly inland from Mansinam Island where the first European missionaries settled on 5 February 1855. The date has become a significant local Christian holiday known as "Gospel Day", celebrated annually across West Papua and Papua.

Language
Indonesian is the official language in the Papua Barat province, just like other provinces in Indonesia. All road signs and documents released by the provincial government are written in Indonesian. However, Papuan Malay is used as the lingua franca of the province, both as a trade language and in inter-ethnic communication. Papuan Malay is considered to be similar to Ambonese Malay and Manado Malay language, and is mutually intelligible with Indonesian though it has been highly influenced by local languages. Nevertheless, its usage is currently diminishing as the proportion of people who are more fluent in Standard Indonesian is increasing.

The number of local languages used by the native peoples of the Papua Barat province reaches 263 consisting of 5 Austronesian languages and 210 Papuan languages.

Regional languages in the Papua Barat province are threatened with extinction, because there are fewer and fewer users. At least 10 regional languages spread across 14 major tribes in the province are threatened with extinction, if not immediately documented and preserved. The threat of extinction is due to economic, educational and political problems. The indigenous Papuans who transact on the market will use Indonesian, because the buyers or sellers are migrants or they speak a different Papuan language. The need for children to use Indonesian daily and the lack of education in schools about regional languages largely contributes to their disuse and extinction.

Culture
Like the other provinces which form part of Indonesian Papua, the Papua Barat province is inhabited by different tribes.

Traditional houses
An exhibition house called Rumah Kaki Seribu (Thousand Legs House) was recently built to exhibit musical instruments, traditional clothing, and handicrafts from the Papua Barat province. The architecture of this building is inspired from that of the region around Manokwari. This traditional house is a stilt house with many pillars. The traditional house whose original roof was made of straw or sago leaves and wood as its pillars. The poles that are made are short and some are high, the pillars are useful for protecting themselves from enemies and the threat of people with evil intentions or black magic.

Clothing
The traditional clothes in the West Papua region are named Serui. Not much different from traditional clothing in Papua, the form of clothing is almost the same for both men and women. They wear clothes and lower body coverings in the same shape. They also wear ornaments on the chest and head in the form of necklaces, bracelets, ornaments of birds of paradise on the other parts of the head. Equipment worn by men at weddings usually have the groom holding a shield such as an arrow or tombah to fulfill the Papuan custom.

Another West Papuan traditional clothing is called Ewer. This garment is purely made from natural ingredients, namely dried straw. With the progress and influence of modernization, these traditional clothes were then equipped with cloth for their superiors. The following is a picture of the traditional Ewer clothing typical of West Papuans. At present, natural materials such as straw or dry fiber are only used as skirts for women. The skirt is made by taking plant fibers and arranging them using a rope at the top. This skirt is made with two layers, the inner layer is knee-length, and the outer layer is shorter. To strengthen skirt ties, belts made of bark are used in such a way. Usually the carving motif is not complicated, namely the gingham with a geometric arrangement.

As for the shirt tops, they use baju kurung made of velvet fabric with knotted tufts on the edges of the arms, neck or waist. This article is derived from outside culture and is usually only used for West Papuans who live around the city of Manokwari. Apart from clothes and skirts, West Papuan traditional clothing for women is also equipped with a variety of accessories such as bracelets, necklaces and headgear. Bracelets and necklaces are usually made from hard grains which are arranged using a piece of yarn, while the head cover is made of cassowary feathers.

For men, the West Papuan traditional clothing worn in ancient times is very different from the traditional clothes worn and introduced today. In the past, men in general only used tassel skirts, the way and materials made were the same as those worn by women. The use of tassel skirts by men is not equipped with a boss so they will only be bare-chested. Today, custom Ewer clothing for men is made of velvet fabric with a more polite model. Knee-length shorts complete with a cloth covering dangling on the front are used as subordinates, while for superiors are used vest shirts made with fabric. Each edge of a piece of men's ewer shirt, both for pants, vests, and cloth covers is usually decorated with bright colored fabric borders. In addition, the indigenous men of West Papua also wear several other accessories to support their appearance. Necklaces and headgear, and war equipment in the form of shields, spears, chopsticks and arrows are some of what usually must be present.

Traditional dance

As West Papua consists of many tribes, there are many traditional dances from each tribe. The most common type of traditional dance is the war dance. This type of dance symbolizes heroism and valor for Papuans. It is usually danced by men with traditional clothings with bows and arrows as weapons. Historically this dance was perform by soldiers before tribal warfare. As tribal warfare largely been eliminated, but this dance was performed as a show or welcome reception. Usually this dance is performed by seven or more people. The music comes from shells, tifas and drums. The dancing is quite energetic and featured some war movements, including archery, jumping, and scouting enemies, among others.

Yospan dance is another dance originating from West Papua, this dance is an amalgamation of two traditional dances namely Yosim dances originating from the bay of Sairei (Serul, Waropen) and Pancar dances originating from Biak, Numfor and Manokwari. The musical instruments used for Yosim usually used are cuku lele (Ukulele), and guitars which shows foreign influences as these were not instruments from Papua. Included was also local bass made from three strings, with the strings made from Pandan leaves. As well as Kalabasa, a dried Calabash, which was then filled with beads. In Yosim dance, the women are dressed with weavings to cover the chest, and headress made from bird feathers. While the men are bare-chested and wearing the same headress. The dance movement are more energetic though simple. In Pancar dance, the music are from Tifa drums which is the universal instruments for coastal Papuans. The drum skin is usually made from soa-soa (lizards). The movements are more stiff following the Tifa beats.

Movements include Seka, this dance movement are usually from southern coast with famous version from Kaimana, Fakfak, and Timika. In Pacul Tiga, or Pancar Meneru the dancer swing forward three steps, and throw both arms and one leg to the left and right, which was then repeated fir the other leg. Jef movements are influenced by rock and roll dance from 1969 to 1971, Gale-Gale movements are from Wondama Bay and Mor-Mambor islands. Pancar movements are performed by the dancers move in a circle. These movements was inspired by animals, and have four variations.

Suanggi dance is from the region around Cendrawasih Bay the northern coast of New Guinea. This dance is basically an exorcism ritual by a bereaved husband after his wife become victim of possession by mythical creatures (angi-angi). Suanggi is an evil spirit which wander the earth because it cannot find peace and will take possession of a woman. The dance is usually only performed when death victims were found, which prompts the tribal leaders to initiate the ritual before the tribe members starting the dance.

Weapons
The bow and arrow is one of the main weapons typical of the tribes in Papua. These traditional weapons of bows and arrows are used for hunting and fighting. The bow is made of bamboo or wood, while the bowstring is made of rattan. The arrows are made of bamboo, wood, or kangaroo bones. Because of bow and arrow materials made from nature, special expertise is needed to use these traditional weapons. Spears are one of the traditional tribal weapons in Papua and West Papua. Traditional tribal spears in Papua are made from natural materials such as wood and stone. Each tribe has a different form of spear, including those with one spear and two spears.

In addition to bows, arrows and spears, indigenous tribes in Papua have traditional daggers made of cassowary bones or bamboo. This knife can be made from the bones of a cassowary or bamboo foot with a tapered tip, while the handle is decorated with cassowary feathers. Traditional weapons from Papua and West Papua made from the bones of cassowary birds are used as a tool in hunting and extracting forest products.

Stone axes are traditional tribal traditional weapons in Papua and West Papua. This stone ax is made of natural stone which is smashed and formed by the eyes of an ax, given a woven frame from a twist of wood fiber and forest orchids, used for cutting, picking and scraping.

Transport
In West Papua, the largest airport is Dominique Edward Osok Airport, located in Sorong. In addition, there are also Fakfak Airport, Rendani Airport in Manokwari and Utarom Airport in Kaimana. Major flights to the West Papua area from Jakarta, Surabaya and Makassar are usually via the airport in Sorong or Biak, then continue with smaller aircraft.

Tourism
In Doreri Bay there are three small islands: Mansinan Island, Lemon Island and Raimuti Island. These islands have a collection of coral reefs. It is estimated that this place has more than 20 former World War II wrecks. But what can be seen clearly is that there are around 6 ships such as Pasir Putih Wreck, a type of Navy patrol boat with a length of 12–22 meters. Pillbox Wreck, a type of commercial cargo carrier carrying around 9–16 meters of ammunition, Cross Wreck is a kind of patrol boat, Mupi Wreck and Shinwa Maru, a cargo ship.

The Cendrawasih Bay National Park have a unique geological structure and very important oceanographic history. This marine national park has extensive coral reefs of the highest quality in the world. Cendrawasih Bay National Park is in five regions and two provinces, namely Teluk Wondana Regency and Manokwari Regency in West Papua Province and Nabire Regency, Yapen Island Regency and Waropen Regency in Papua Province. Local communities living around national parks use marine resources as a source of life. Cendrawasih Bay National Park is a bay surrounded by several islands, including Biak Island, Yapen Island, and the mainland New Guinea. Administratively, the area is in two Regency, namely Teluk Wondama Regency, West Papua Province and Nabire Regency, Papua Province.

Raja Ampat is an archipelago that is administratively located in the Raja Ampat Regency, West Papua Province. This island is a destination for divers who are interested in the underwater scenery. Raja Ampat Islands is one of the 10 best waters for diving in the whole world, so it has the potential to be a tourist location, especially diving tours. In this place it is also home to 75% of the world's coral species, in the village of Saindarek, when the tides are lowest, we can see coral reefs without diving. Some unique species that can be found while diving in Raja Ampat are several types of pygmy seahorses, wobbegongs, and Manta rays.

Sawinggrai Tourism Village is a village located in Meos Mansar Subdistrict, Raja Ampat Regency, West Papua. It is one of the place in the province to see Bird of Paradise which is still maintained today. Sawinggrai Village Tourism Sites are currently inhabited by around 36 families and some of them have the expertise to make handicrafts typical of sculpture. There are four species of Bird of Paradise that are preserved here, namely the Red bird-of-paradise (Paradisaea Rubra), Magnificent bird-of-paradise (Cicinnurus Magnificus), Lesser bird-of-paradise (Paradisaea Minor) and Greater bird-of-paradise (Paradisaea Apoda). One of the four species, the Red bird of paradise, is a typical icon of Sawinggrai Village.

Villages 
 

Aredo
Mogoi

Notable people 
 Abdul Hakim Achmad Aituarauw, Indonesian politician and King of Kaimana
 Adolf Kabo, Indonesian footballer
 Boaz Solossa, Indonesian footballer
 Dominggus Mandacan, Indonesia politician
 Engelberd Sani, Indonesian footballer
 Johannes Abraham Dimara, Indonesia national hero, leader of Trikora infiltration force in Etna Bay
 Machmud Singgirei Rumagesan, Indonesian national hero
 Marlina Flassy, anthropologist and the first woman to be a Dean at Cenderawasih University
 Nehemia Solossa, Indonesian footballer
 Ricky Kambuaya, Indonesian footballer
 Ortizan Solossa, Indonesian footballer

See also

Free Papua Movement
Districts of West Papua
List of rivers of West Papua
Papua Conflict

Notes

References

Bibliography
 1989, 2003 Monbiot, George. Poisoned Arrows: An investigative journey through the forbidden lands of West Papua. London. Michael Joseph, Green Books.

External links
 
 

 
Provinces of Indonesia

Autonomous provinces
Ethnic conflicts in Indonesia
States and territories established in 2003
2003 establishments in Indonesia